Slavko Lisica (Serbian Cyrillic: Славко Лисица; 18 February 1944 – 28 June 2013) was a Major general of the Army of Republika Srpska, a former commander of the Second Armored Brigade of the Army of Republika Srpska and commander of the Doboj Operational Group (OG Doboj).

General Slavko Lisica is mentioned in the song Ljubav udari često tamo gdje ne treba, on the album Ja nisam odavle (1997) by Zabranjeno pušenje from Belgrade (today known as The No Smoking Orchestra). He is also mentioned in the Croatian Patriotic War Song "Lijo, Lisice, Zar Te Boli Glava" (English: Lijo, Lisice, Does Your Head Hurt), which makes reference to Lisica's T-55's which were lost to the 110th Usorska Brigade of the Croatian Defence Council.

References

1944 births
2013 deaths
People from Gradiška, Bosnia and Herzegovina
Serbs of Bosnia and Herzegovina
Serbian generals
Army of Republika Srpska soldiers
Officers of the Yugoslav People's Army
Yugoslav military personnel